Edith Graef McGeer,  (born November 18, 1923) is an American-Canadian neuroscientist, best known for her work and contributions to the research of prevention and treatment of Alzheimer's and other neurodegenerative diseases. Edith McGeer, along with her husband and co-collaborator, Patrick McGeer, were recognized by the International Scientific Institute as one of the 100 most highly cited researchers in neuroscience.   She's a co-founder of Aurin Biotech, which is advancing the drug AUR1107  in pre-clinical trials and FDA approval as an anti-inflammatory treatment for Alzheimer's, muscular degenerative conditions and some cancers.

Education
McGeer, who says her interest in mathematics began when she was five, skipped grades at the St. Agatha's School for Girls. At 16 years old, she declared a chemistry major at Swarthmore College and was not met with encouragement from the head of the chemistry department, since science wasn't considered a fitting profession for a woman in 1940. Graduating Phi Beta Kappa, McGeer completed her doctorate in organic chemistry from the University of Virginia in two years.

Career accomplishments and awards 
McGeer was a research chemist for the DuPont Company and moved to Vancouver, British Columbia where she worked as a research assistant at the University of British Columbia Medical School and eventually received the title of Professor Emeritus. McGeer holds 10 patents and has contributed to 525 articles and is the recipient of a special award by the British Columbia Science Council for lifetime contribution.

McGeer is identified as one of the top 100 most highly cited neuroscientists. She was jointly appointed as an Officer of the Order of Canada in 1995 and a Fellow of the Royal Society of Canada in 2001.

References 

1923 births
Living people
20th-century American women scientists
Alzheimer's disease researchers
American neuroscientists
Scientists from New York City
Swarthmore College alumni
University of Virginia alumni
American women neuroscientists
American expatriates in Canada